Borleske Stadium is a multi-purpose outdoor athletic stadium in the northwest United States, located in Walla Walla, Washington.

The stadium is named for Raymond Vincent Borleske (1887–1957), a legendary Whitman College athlete (class of 1910) and coach. It has served as the home for a variety of professional and amateur teams in both football and baseball.

The stadium is part of the Borleske Stadium Complex containing Borleske Stadium, Martin Field, and Memorial Pool. It is the home venue of the Whitman College baseball team and the Walla Walla Sweets of the West Coast League. Following baseball season stadium is transitioned to be the home of Walla Walla High School football.

Layout
The layout of Borleske Stadium is like most minor league ballparks, although it is unconventionally oriented southeast. In August the field is transitioned for football with the pitchers mound removed and sod placed over the infield. The sideline of the field runs parallel with the right field foul line. The entrance gate is located beyond right field and is utilized for baseball and football.

Walla Walla Sweets Configuration
Entering the stadium, fans will pass by the Sweets customer service booth. Here you can get Borleske Bulletins, Walla Walla Sweets newsletter, and any regular customer service needs. To the right of customer service, you will find the general admission area known as section F, also you will find the Laht Neppur Outfield Pub, only during Sweets games. Continuing left of customer service, going down the path you will find, on your right, you will find the grill also known as The Sweets spot. On you left you will find the main concession stand dubbed Sluggers: Ballpark Favorites. Here you can find a wide range of ballpark favorites found Here. To the right of Sluggers you will find the Sweets Shoppe, where you can find all your Walla Walla Sweets gear. Going down the path, on the left you can see the marvelous Grandstands of Borleske Stadium. They are broken into 4 parts, seating sections A, B, C, and D they are broken up by a set of staircases. On the opposite side of the Grandstands and before the playing field you will see the box seats, only available during Sweets games, they are the closest to the action. Continuing down the main walkway you will see the visiting team's dugout. Then, up ahead, you will find the crown jewel of Borleske Stadium, the Diamond and Premier Sections of Borleske Stadium. Used during all games of Borleske Stadium, they are the only stadium style seating in the stadium. Then continuing down the main walkway, and to the right, you will find the other section of Bleachers. Section E is the last seating area in the park. It is made of a combination on plastic, wood, and metal. Finally, the last part of Borleske Stadium is the Budweiser Beer Garden. It is the only part of Borleske that is not to move that is not part of the seating part of Borleske Stadium that is not seating related. Alcohol is only available during Sweets games. Also, absolutely no external food or drink is allowed past the gates of Borleske Stadium.

Field Boxes 
Six field boxes were added right along the fence along the first base line.  Each field box holds 10 seats and every two boxes are served by a stadium waiter. The first three boxes include protective netting - an indicator of just how close to the action these boxes are! All six come with drink/snack trays and daily, complimentary Sweets programs, stuffed with a Budweiser scorecard and the daily Sherwin Williams Borleske Bulletin.

Diamond/Premier Seats 
The Diamond (AA & BB) and Premier (CC & DD) seating sections are located directly behind home plate. A total of 252 stadium-style seats were added, 14 of which are Physically Disabled Accessible along with 14 companion seats. The premier seats come with waiter service for your convenience, so you will never miss any of the action!

The Sweets Shoppe 
The Sweets Shoppe at Borleske Stadium is a fully functioning point of sale for all Sweets' merchandise, hats, clothing and apparel. It opens one hour before the first pitch and closes during the 9th inning on a daily basis. The Sweets Shoppe is located on the main concourse directly across from the Concessions Stand.

Concessions Stand 
The complete overhaul of the Borleske Stadium Concessions Stand included a new range and freezer/refrigeration system, a new three-section sink for proper cleaning, a new floor, new walls, and three new points of sale to allow customers to move in and out of the concessions area quickly.

The Sweet Spot 
Located down the right-field line, nestled up against the visiting bullpen is the Sweet Spot presented by Key Technology. The Sweet Spot serves as a party deck for group ticket holders over 20 that elect for an all-you-can-eat BBQ starting a half-hour before gates open to the public and running up to first pitch. The Sweet Spot has a 100-person capacity and houses the Borleske Stadium covered grill.

Dugouts 
The new and improved dugouts at Borleske Stadium are sunken into the ground and feature a double-deck seating area, the artificial surface at ground level to walk on and view the game, a storage area for helmets and bats and a protective netting that runs the length of each dugout to keep foul balls from screaming into the sitting area without obstructing the view from within.

Budweiser Beer Garden 
Many adults at Borleske Stadium find their way down the left-field line to the Budweiser Beer Garden. The Bud Barn serves Budweiser products and local microbrews along with several local wines. It is a popular spectating area, providing umbrella-covered tables and chairs and starting in 2011, pub tables and bar stools.

Former tenants
Blue Mountain Bears (1983)
Walla Walla Padres (1973-1982)
Walla Walla Islanders (1972)
Walla Walla Phillies (1970-1971)
Walla Walla Bears (1969)
Whitman College football
Walla Walla High School baseball
Walla Walla Community College football
Walla Walla Phillies (1970, 1971)
Walla Walla Padres (1973–1982)

Current tenants
Whitman College baseball
Walla Walla Sweets
Walla Walla High School football

Notables who played at Borleske
Kurt Russell (actor), with Walla Walla Islanders (1972)
Ozzie Smith (MLB Hall of Famer), with Walla Walla Padres (1977)
Tony Gwynn (MLB Hall of Famer), with Walla Walla Padres (1981)
John Kruk (former MLB All-Star), with Walla Walla Padres (1981)
Drew Bledsoe (NFL quarterback), first selection of the 1993 NFL Draft, Walla Walla High School (class of 1990)
Howie Bedell
Bob Beall
Dane Iorg
Tom Trebelhorn

References

External links
 Walla Walla Sweets: Borleske Stadium

College baseball venues in the United States
College football venues
High school football venues in the United States
Whitman Fighting Missionaries football
American football venues in Washington (state)
Baseball venues in Washington (state)
Buildings and structures in Walla Walla County, Washington
1926 establishments in Washington (state)
Sports venues completed in 1926
Minor league baseball venues